"Heavy Disguise" is a song by English band Strawbs written by bassist John Ford. The track first appeared on the Grave New World album and features just John Ford from the band singing and accompanying himself on the acoustic guitar backed by "The Robert Kirby Silver Band" – i.e. a brass section arranged by Robert Kirby (who later became a Strawbs keyboard player).

Ford has said in interview that the song was inspired by the rhythm of a Jethro Tull song he heard on the radio. The lyrical content was inspired by him seeing a news report of a Vietnamese demonstration at the US embassy, but also draws heavily from the situation prevalent in Northern Ireland at the time (in the same way that "New World" does). The song was originally entitled "IRA Meeting Blues".

Personnel

John Ford – vocals, acoustic guitar

with

The Robert Kirby Silver Band

External links
 Lyrics to "Heavy Disguise" at Strawbsweb official site

References

Sleeve notes to album CD 540 934-2 Grave New World (A&M 1998 Remastered)
John Ford interview on Strawbsweb

Strawbs songs
1972 songs
Songs written by John Ford (musician)